The Cecidomyiinae, commonly known as gall midges or gall gnats, is the largest subfamily in Cecidomyiidae with over 600 genera and more than 5000 described species. This subfamily is best known for its members that induce galls on plants, but there are also many species that are fungivores, parasitoids, or predators as maggots.

Cecidomyiinae is monophyletic and species of the subfamily can be distinguished from other Cecidomyiidae by characters of the male genitalia, the number of antennal segments, and bristles on the larval abdomen.

Systematics
Cecidomyiinae - supertribes, tribes, and genera:

Supertribe Asphondyliidi
Tribe Asphondyliini
Asphondylia Loew, 1850
Tribe Kiefferiini
Kiefferia  Mik, 1895
Tribe Polystephini
Polystepha Kieffer, 1897
Tribe Schizomyiini
Placochela Rübsaamen, 1916
Schizomyia Kieffer, 1889
Supertribe Cecidomyiidi
Tribe Anadiplosini
Tribe Aphidoletini
Tribe Cecidomyiini
Acodiplosis Kieffer, 1895
Ametrodiplosis Rübsaamen, 1910
Anabremia Kieffer, 1912
Anisostephus Rübsaamen, 1917
Antichiridium Rübsaamen, 1911
Aphidoletes Kieffer, 1904
Arthrocnodax Rübsaamen, 1895
Atrichosema Kieffer, 1904
Blastodiplosis Kieffer, 1912
Camptodiplosis Kieffer, 1912
Cecidomyia Fischer von Waldheim\nMeigen, 1803
Clinodiplosis Kieffer, 1894
Contarinia Rondani, 1860
Coquillettomyia Felt, 1908
Dichodiplosis Rübsaamen, 1910
Diodaulus Rübsaamen, 1917
Drisina Giard, 1893
Endaphis Kieffer, 1896
Endopsylla de Meijere, 1907
Feltiella Rübsaamen, 1910
Geodiplosis Kieffer, 1909
Giardomyia Felt, 1908
Hadrobremia Kieffer, 1912
Haplodiplosis Rübsaamen, 1910
Harmandiola Skuhravá, 1997
Hygrodiplosis Kieffer, 1912
Lestodiplosis Kieffer, 1894
Loewiola Kieffer, 1896
Macrodiplosis Kieffer, 1895
Mamaevia Skuhravá, 1967
Massalongia Kieffer, 1897
Monarthropalpus Rübsaamen, 1892
Monobremia Kieffer, 1912
Monodiplosis Rübsaamen, 1910
Mycocecis Edwards, 1922
Mycodiplosis Rübsaamen, 1895
Myricomyia Kieffer, 1900
Octodiplosis Giard, 1894
Parallelodiplosis Rübsaamen, 1910
Planetella Westwood, 1840
Plemeliella Seitner, 1908
Putoniella Kieffer, 1896
Resseliella Seitner, 1906
Silvestriola Skuhravá, 1997
Sitodiplosis Kieffer, 1913
Stenodiplosis Reuter, 1895
Thecodiplosis Kieffer, 1895
Tricholaba Rübsaamen, 1917
Xenodiplosis Felt, 1911
Xylodiplosis Kieffer, 1894
Zeuxidiplosis Kieffer, 1904
Tribe Centrodiplosini
Tribe Clinodiplosini
Schismatodiplosis Rübsaamen, 1916
Supertribe Lasiopteridi
Tribe Alycaulini
 Alycaulus
 Asteromyia
 Astictoneura
 Atolasioptera
 Baccharomyia
 Brachylasioptera
 Calamomyia
 Chilophaga
 Couridiplosis
 Edestochilus
 Edestosperma
 Epilasioptera
 Geraldesia
 Lobolasioptera
 Marilasioptera
 Meunieriella
 Neolasioptera
 Protaplonyx
 Smilasioptera
 Xipholasioptera
Tribe Brachineurini
Brachineura Rondani, 1840
Brachyneurina Mamaev, 1967
Mikiola Kieffer, 1912
Prolauthia Rübsaamen, 1915
Tribe Lasiopterini
Baldratia Kieffer, 1897
Hybolasioptera Rübsaamen, 1915
Lasioptera Fischer von Waldheim\nMeigen, 1818
Ozirhincus Rondani, 1840
Stefaniella Kieffer, 1898
Tribe Ledomyiini
Ledomyia Kieffer, 1895
Tribe Oligotrophini
Amerhapha Rübsaamen, 1914
Arceuthomyia Kieffer, 1913
Arnoldiola Strand, 1926
Bayeriola Gagné, 1991
Blastomyia Kieffer, 1913
Bremiola Rübsaamen, 1915
Craneiobia Kieffer, 1913
Cystiphora Kieffer, 1892
Dasineura Rondani, 1840
Didymomyia Rübsaamen, 1912
Fabomyia Fedotova, 1991
Geocrypta Kieffer, 1913
Gephyraulus Rübsaamen, 1915
Giraudiella Rübsaamen, 1915
Hartigiola Rübsaamen, 1912
Iteomyia Kieffer, 1913
Jaapiella Rübsaamen, 1915
Janetiella Kieffer, 1898
Kaltenbachiola Hedicke, 1938
Lathyromyza Rübsaamen, 1915
Macrolabis Kieffer, 1892
Mayetiola Kieffer, 1896
Mikomya Kieffer, 1912
Misospatha Kieffer, 1913
Neomikiella Hedicke, 1938
Oligotrophus Latreille, 1805
Pemphigocecis Rübsaamen, 1915
Phegomyia Kieffer, 1913
Physemocecis Rübsaamen, 1914
Psectrosema Kieffer, 1904
Rabdophaga Westwood, 1847
Rhopalomyia Rübsaamen, 1892
Rondaniola Rübsaamen & Hedicke, 1938
Sackenomyia Felt, 1908
Schmidtiella Rübsaamen, 1914
Semudobia Kieffer, 1913
Spurgia Gagné, 1990
Taxomyia Rübsaamen, 1912
Trotteria Kieffer, 1901
Wachtliella Rübsaamen, 1915
Zygiobia Kieffer, 1913

See also
 List of Cecidomyiinae genera

References

 
Nematocera subfamilies